George Cornewall was a British politician, soldier and baronet.

George Cornwall or Cornewall may also refer to:

Other members of the Hereforshire family
George Cornwall (MP) (died 1562), MP for Herefordshire
Sir George Cornewall, 3rd Baronet (1774–1835) of the Cornewall baronets
Sir George Cornewall, 5th Baronet (1833–1908) of the Cornewall baronets

Others
Captain George Cornwall, see Queen (East Indiaman)
George Cornwall (aircraft designer)

See also
George Cornewall Lewis (1806–1863), British statesman
George Cornwell, British railway engineer and building contractor in Australia